The 2011 Copa Bionaire was a professional tennis tournament played on outdoor clay courts. It was the fifth edition of the tournament which was part of the 2011 ITF Women's Circuit. It took place in Cali, Colombia between 7 and 13 February 2011.

The 2011 edition was one of the biggest ITF Circuit Tournaments of the year with US$100,000 in prize money.

WTA entrants

Seeds

 Rankings are as of January 31, 2011.

Other entrants
The following players received wildcards into the singles main draw:
  Ana Clara Duarte
  Karen Castiblanco
  Yuliana Lizarazo
  Zuzana Zlochová

The following players received entry from the qualifying draw:
  Laura Siegemund
  Irina-Camelia Begu
  Alexandra Cadanţu
  Ioana Raluca Olaru

Champions

Singles

 Irina-Camelia Begu def.  Laura Pous Tió, 6–3, 7–6(1)

Doubles

 Irina-Camelia Begu /  Elena Bogdan def.  Ekaterina Ivanova /  Kathrin Wörle, 2–6, 7–6(6), [11–9]

References

External links
Official website
ITF search 

Copa Bionaire
2011 in Colombian tennis
Copa Bionaire